Sharanjit Leyl (born 1973) is a former Singaporean producer/presenter, for the BBC. She regularly anchored Asia Business Report and Newsday on BBC One, the BBC News Channel and BBC World News from the BBC's Singapore studio. She was also a reporter and producer on the shows along with World Business Report. She has filed reports for radio on the BBC World Service business programmes as well as its arts and culture programmes, and written for BBC news online.

Early life and education
Leyl was born in Singapore to a Sikh family of Indian descent that migrated to Singapore during the 1930s., Leyl moved to Washington D.C. in her teens with her family, where her father worked for the Singapore Ministry of Defence in defence procurement. There she earned a degree in both journalism and English Literature from the University of Maryland College Park. She then moved to Vancouver, British Columbia, Canada where she completed a master's degree in English Literature at the University of British Columbia which focused on post-colonial writers such as Salman Rushdie.

Career
Leyl began her broadcasting career at the Canadian Broadcasting Corporation in 1997. While there she reported for the award-winning show, "The Pacific Rim Report". In 1999 she moved to Singapore where she had a similar role at the financial news service provider Bridge Information Systems.

She joined Bloomberg Television in March 2000 and moved to its headquarters in Tokyo. There she presented its main three-hour newscast, "On The Money Asia", reporting on breaking financial stories as well as major news events such as the US-led invasion of Iraq in March 2003.  Leyl played an integral role in editing and influencing the content of Bloomberg's Asian programming.

Leyl joined the BBC as a producer and reporter in September 2003 and has since reported and presented from places as far afield as Pakistan, Tokyo and London. She has also presented Impact, Global, World Business Report, Asia Today and 'World News Today'' during several spells in London. She left in June 2021, after 18 years with the corporation.

Her other interviews have included the Chairman of Starbucks, Howard Schultz; Prime Minister of Canada, Justin Trudeau; the Prime Minister of Pakistan; former leaders of Singapore and Malaysia; and heads of the World Bank.

Personal life
Leyl lives with her English husband and their son in Singapore. Her hobbies include running, politics, art and theatre.

References

External links
 https://sharanjitleyl.com/
 BBC Biography: Sharanjit Leyl
 

1973 births
Living people
University of Maryland, College Park alumni
University of British Columbia alumni
BBC newsreaders and journalists
BBC World News
BBC World Service people
Singaporean television journalists
Singaporean people of Indian descent